Dorm Room Fund is a $10 million American venture capital firm focused on investments in student-run startups. Established by First Round Capital in 2012, the firm is operated by full-time undergraduate and graduate students. It has backed companies that have raised a combined $300 million in venture capital from investors including Y Combinator, Sequoia Capital, Andreessen Horowitz, and Union Square Ventures. With investments in over 100 companies, the firm is one of the most active seed-stage investors in the US. The firm has teams in San Francisco, New York City, Philadelphia, and Boston.

In addition to providing early-stage capital, Dorm Room Fund draws upon its own resources as well as First Round's to support student entrepreneurs. In January 2018, Dorm Room Fund's Head of Engineering Yasyf Mohamedali launched VCWiz, a tool to help founders (student or otherwise) research, discover, and reach out to seed-stage investors. In February 2018, Snap Inc. announced a program to provide free advertising on Snapchat to select up-and-coming startups, targeting Dorm Room Fund portfolio companies in particular.

Portfolio 
Dorm Room Fund's portfolio includes A&B American Style, Brooklinen, Blockstack, FiscalNote, Elektra Labs, LearnLux, LovePop, Grove Labs, BevSpot, Bevi, Humon, and TetraScience. Notable acquisitions within the portfolio include tbh (acquired by Facebook), Firefly, Zodiac (acquired by Nike), and Yard Club (acquired by Caterpillar).

References 

Financial services companies established in 2012
American companies established in 2012
Venture capital firms of the United States